Menisciopsis is a small genus of ferns in the family Thelypteridaceae.

Taxonomy
Menisciopsis was raised to the rank of genus from Pronephrium sect. Menisciopsis in 2021 as a result of a phylogenetic study of the family Thelypteridaceae.

Species
, World Ferns accepted the following species:
Menisciopsis boydiae (D.C.Eaton) S.E.Fawc. & A.R.Sm.
Menisciopsis cyatheoides (Kaulf.) S.E.Fawc. & A.R.Sm.
Menisciopsis lakhimpurensis (Rosenst.) S.E.Fawc. & A.R.Sm.
Menisciopsis penangiana (Hook.) S.E.Fawc. & A.R.Sm.
Menisciopsis rubida (J.Sm. ex Hook.) S.E.Fawc. & A.R.Sm.
Menisciopsis rubrinervis (Mett.) S.E.Fawc. & A.R.Sm.
Menisciopsis wailele (Flynn) S.E.Fawc. & A.R.Sm.

References

Thelypteridaceae
Fern genera